Breakout (simplified Chinese: 破天网) is a Singaporean Chinese drama television series which was broadcast on Singapore's free-to-air channel, MediaCorp Channel 8. The series starred Jeanette Aw, Elvin Ng, Zhou Ying, Christopher Lee, Dai Xiangyu and Guo Liang. It debuted on 6 December 2010, and ended on 7 January 2011. This drama consisted of 25 episodes, and was screened on weekday night at 9:00 pm.

It won Best Drama Serial in 2010 at Star Awards.

Title
The drama's title translates to the Technical Analysis term in financial markets, referring to super-villain Yang Tianwei's attempt to trade using that strategy so as to get rich quickly enough to seek revenge for his murdered son rather than wait for justice to be meted out.

Cast

Yang family

Tang family

Zou Jieming's family

Other characters

Broadcast
It was the tenth Channel 8 drama to be fully filmed in HD and the first to be filmed in Dolby Digital.

This drama was encored from 30 November 2011 to 3 January 2012 at midnight and once more from 28 September 2022 to 25 October 2022, and was now rated as PG for violence, similar to The Ultimatum. As a result, The Family Court and The Score were not being broadcast at midnight, but at 5.30pm instead.

Awards and nominations

Breakout lead the nominations for, and won the most awards for acting and technical categories in the 2011 Star Awards ceremony. It also won three nominations and commendations at the 2011 Asian Television Awards.

Star Awards 2011

Asian Television Awards

Parody
During the awards ceremony, Christopher Lee, Huang Wenyong, Ben Yeo and other actors performed a parody of the series. Lee, portraying Breakout director Chong Liung Man, and his "camera crew" (played by Huang and Yeo) were filming a scene on the harbour. Veteran radio deejay Dennis Chew played Yang Tianwei, ceremony co-host Quan Yi Fong played Yang Nianqing, popular television host Lee Teng played Yang Zhenfeng, award nominee Zhou Ying reprised her role as Tang Ying and Quan's co-host Guo Liang played Zou Jieming.

See also
List of programmes broadcast by Mediacorp Channel 8

References

External links
Breakout (Chinese) on MediaCorp website

2010 Singaporean television series debuts
2011 Singaporean television series endings
Autism in television
Singapore Chinese dramas
Channel 8 (Singapore) original programming